Trigger Happy is a book by Steven Poole, examining videogames in terms of their aesthetic appeal - what makes certain games more fun to play than others. It covers aspects such as the effective use of space and perspective in videogames, rewards and progression through games, the design of an appealing video game character and the debate over violence in games.

In different editions (published by Fourth Estate and Arcade Publishing, it has had the subtitles The Inner Life of Videogames and Videogames and the Entertainment Revolution.

Trigger Happy was released for free in pdf format under a Creative Commons license in 2007.  The book may be downloaded from the author's website.

See also
Video game studies
List of books on computer and video games

External links
Trigger Happy at Steven Poole official website
Gameshrine.co.uk interview with Steven Poole
Polygon Web interview with Steven Poole

2000 non-fiction books
Books about video games
Creative Commons-licensed books